L.D. Austin (September 17, 1918 – August 25, 1971) was a NASCAR Grand National Series driver.  He raced in the 1959 Daytona 500 and the 1960 Daytona 500.  He also finished in the top ten in the Grand National Standings from 1957–1959.  He never earned a pole position, but did make a front row start.  He is also one of the drivers with the most starts without a win.

References

External links

1918 births
1971 deaths
Racing drivers from North Carolina
NASCAR drivers